Mohamed Fofana (born 21 October 1985 in Conakry, Guinea) is a Guinean former footballer who spent most of his career playing in Finland.

In 2007 Fofana was a member of the Guinean Olympic team.

References

1985 births
Living people
Guinean footballers
Association football midfielders
Oxford United F.C. players
Myllykosken Pallo −47 players
FC Lahti players
Porin Palloilijat players
Atlantis FC players
FC Viikingit players
Veikkausliiga players
Ykkönen players
Kakkonen players
Guinean expatriate footballers
Guinean expatriate sportspeople in England
Guinean expatriate sportspeople in Finland
Expatriate footballers in England
Expatriate footballers in Finland